Chuck Jeffreys is an American actor, stuntman, stunt coordinator, fight choreographer. As an actor he has appeared in more than 24 films and television shows. He had supporting roles in Aftershock, Lockdown, Superfights and The Substitute 2: School's Out  and co-starred in the 1997 film Bloodmoon. He is also the Fire Warlord in the Digital Pictures full-motion video action game Supreme Warrior.  From the late 1980s to 2016 he had worked on more than 60 films and television shows in various stunt roles. He was the fight coordinator for the 2015 television series The Player.

Background
Jeffreys is originally from Washington. He grew up  in Hillcrest Heights in Prince George's County.
He has been studying martial arts since around the age of 7 or 8. As a martial artist he has studied under Sifu Willy Lin.

It has been said that he has a resemblance to Eddie Murphy.  In the late 1980s he joined the cast of the WJLA Saturday show "Pick Up The Beat. He also filled in for Erik King as the shows host.

Career

Actor
Some of the martial arts films he has acted in include Hawkeye and Fight to Win. Both films also starred George Chung.
He co-starred as Detective Chuck Baker in the film Bloodmoon that starred Darren Shahlavi. He had a major supporting role in the film Zong heng tian xia aka Honor and Glory which starred Cynthia Rothrock, which was released in 1993.

Stunts
As a choreographer he has worked with Jessica Biel, Willem Dafoe, Tobey Maguire, Ryan Reynolds and Wesley Snipes.  
He did stunt work for the film 12 Monkeys which was released in 1995.
Jeffreys was also responsible for getting Darren Shahlavi the stunt work  on Blade: Trinity. Jeffreys did work on Jump Street, released in 2012. He was one of the stunt coordinators for the 2015 films Black Mass,  which was a film about the career of infamous American mobster James "Whitey" Bulger, and Miles Ahead, which was a film about jazz musician Miles Davis.

Filmography (selective)

References

External links
 Put Up a Fight -- Without a Fight by Sean Kelly

1958 births
African-American male actors
American male film actors
American stunt performers
American male television actors
American wushu practitioners
Living people
21st-century African-American people
20th-century African-American people